= Koguryŏ pigi =

Lost Korean esoteric book

Koguryŏ pigi (Korean: 고구려비기; Hanja: 高句麗秘記) is a theorized Korean prophetic book that predicted the downfall of the Korean state Goguryeo. The book is attested to in other records, although it is some uncertainty that it exists. Its contents are mostly unknown; all that is known of it is that it predicted Goguryeo's downfall within a 900 years by an 80-year-old military commander.
